Sierra Records is an independent record label based in Etiwanda, California.

History
Sierra Records founder John Delgatto first launched Briar Records, which released folk and bluegrass music by artists including Leslie Keith; the Doc Watson Family, Toulouse Engelhardt, the Bluegrass Cardinals, Earl Collins, and the Kentucky Colonels.

In 1977, Delgatto founded Sierra Records to issue recordings by members and ex-members of The Byrds, new music by other artists, and reissues of archival recordings. Initially, Delgatto released albums under the Sierra/Briar label.

Sierra Records gained wide recognition in 1982 with the release of the Gram Parsons and the Fallen Angels Live 1973 album, which received a Grammy nomination for Best Country Performance by a Duo/Group for the song "Love Hurts."

Through the years, Sierra Records has expanded by adding DVDs, books, and posters to their product line, by building a collection of rare material by licensing individual songs from other companies, and by releasing high-quality vinyl LPs under the Sierra High Fidelity imprint.

Sierra Records has significantly added to the depth of material available by artists such as Gram Parsons, Gene Clark, and Clarence White.

Roster

 Skip Battin
 Bluegrass Etc.
 Gene Clark
 Shep Cooke
 Toulouse Engelhardt
 Country Gazette
 The Credibility Gap
 Doug Dillard
 Ever Call Ready
 Fox Family
 Steve Gillette
 Richard Greene
 Slavek Hanzlik
 The Hillmen
 Lynette Johnson
 George Jones
 Kentucky Colonels
 David Meltzer
 Muleskinner
 Nashville West
 Ray Park
 Parsons Green
 Gene Parsons and Meridian Green
 Gram Parsons
 The Reinsmen
 Phil Rosenthal
 Steve Spurgin
 Scotty Stoneman
 Clarence White

See also 
 List of record labels

References

External links
 

American record labels
American independent record labels